Catephia albirena is a species of moth of the  family Erebidae. It is found in Ethiopia.

References

Endemic fauna of Ethiopia
Catephia
Moths described in 1926
Moths of Africa